Wellesley Road tram stop is a halt on the Tramlink service in the London Borough of Croydon. It consists of a single platform on Wellesley Road at the diverge just before the Croydon Underpass and is served southbound only. All Tramlink routes call at the stop.

References

External links

Wellesley Road tram stop on  The Trams website

Tramlink stops in the London Borough of Croydon
Railway stations in Great Britain opened in 2000